John Cranch Walker Vivian (18 April 1818 – 22 January 1879) was an English Liberal politician from the Vivian family who sat in the House of Commons variously between 1841 and 1871.

Career 
Vivian was the second son of the Lieutenant-general Sir Richard Hussey Vivian and his first wife Eliza De Crespigny, daughter of Philip Campion De Crespigny. Born at the Château de Rosamel in Frencq, France, he was educated at Eton College and joined the 11th Hussars as cornet in February 1836. He became a lieutenant in December 1837, captain in April 1840 and retired in 1842. Vivian was a deputy lieutenant and JP for Cornwall.
 
Vivian was elected Member of Parliament for Penryn and Falmouth in July 1841 and held the seat until July 1847. He was elected MP for Bodmin in April 1857 and held the seat until May 1859, when he stood unsuccessfully at Truro. At the 1865 general election he was elected Member of Parliament for Truro and he held the seat until 1871. He was appointed a Lord of the Treasury in December 1868, holding office until 1870 when he was appointed Financial Secretary to the War Office. He held that office until 1871 when he was appointed Under-Secretary of State for War, thereby vacating his seat.

Vivian died at the age of 60 at his home at The Priory, Richmond, London, leaving a personal estate of less than £1,000 to his widow.

Family 
Vivian married firstly in 1840 Louisa Woodgate, daughter of Henry Woodgate. She died in 1855 and he married secondly in 1861 Florence Grosvenor Rowley, daughter of Major Rowley of the Bombay Cavalry. They were divorced in August 1869 after she eloped with the Marquess of Waterford, and married him on 3 July 1872. She died 4 April 1873. Vivian married, thirdly, Emma Harvey in 1876.
His grandson, Herbert Vivian was a journalist, writer and newspaper proprietor who was one of the key members of the Neo-Jacobite Revival of the 1880s and 1890s.

References

External links 
 

1818 births
1879 deaths
Liberal Party (UK) MPs for English constituencies
UK MPs 1841–1847
UK MPs 1857–1859
UK MPs 1865–1868
UK MPs 1868–1874
Deputy Lieutenants of Cornwall
Younger sons of barons
11th Hussars officers
People educated at Eton College
English justices of the peace
John
Members of the Parliament of the United Kingdom for Penryn and Falmouth
Members of the Parliament of the United Kingdom for Bodmin
Members of the Parliament of the United Kingdom for Truro